Howz Gel (also Romanized as Ḩowẕ Gel) is a village in Donbaleh Rud-e Jonubi Rural District, Dehdez District, Izeh County, Khuzestan Province, Iran. At the 2006 census, its population was 42, in 6 families.

References 

Populated places in Izeh County